The Greater Western Sydney Giants–Western Bulldogs rivalry is an Australian Rules football (AFL) rivalry between the Greater Western Sydney Giants and the Western Bulldogs.

The Giants have engaged in a bitter rivalry with the Western Bulldogs since the 2014 AFL season when Bulldogs captain Ryan Griffen and Giants player Tom Boyd were spectacularly exchanged in the same trade deal, and it ignited when the two teams met in the 2016 AFL first preliminary final, regarded the best AFL game of the 2010s by Channel 7.

History

2012–2013: Creation of the Giants and Early Years 
The Greater Western Sydney Giants were created in 2012 as the competition's 18th active club. The Giants played their first competitive outing against the Bulldogs in Round 5 in Canberra. The Giants would only win two games the entire season and finish their first season in the AFL last on the ladder, earning the wooden spoon. The Western Bulldogs finished 15th, winning five total games.

In the 2013 AFL Season, the Bulldogs would beat the Giants in Round 15 with a score of 87–83 at Startrack Oval in Canberra. The Giants would finish last with one win for the season, their second wooden spoon. Bulldogs finished 15th with eight wins.

2014–2016: Griffen Boyd Trade and First Final Meeting 
In the 2014 AFL Season, the Bulldogs and Giants would play twice: In Round 4 at Startrack Oval in Canberra, where Bulldogs defeated Giants 110–83; and in Round 23 at Etihad Stadium, where the Giants would get the club's first-ever win over the Bulldogs, 115–109. The Bulldogs would finish the 2014 season 14th, with seven wins, and the Giants would finish 16th, winning six games for the season.

During the 2014 off-season, Bulldogs captain Ryan Griffen sensationally requested a trade to the Giants. Griffen was widely regarded as the club's best player and had only been captain for one season. He later cited the stress of captaincy as his reason for nearly giving up the game altogether. The Bulldogs responded by luring the Giants' number-one draft pick, first-year key forward Tom Boyd, on a 7-year deal worth $7 million after GWS bowed to the Western Bulldogs' demands. Griffen and Boyd were ultimately exchanged in the same trade deal. 

In the 2015 AFL Season, Bulldogs defeated Giants 113–68 in Round 9 at Eithad Stadium. The Bulldogs would finish the 2015 season 6th with fourteen wins and reach the elimination final losing to Adelaide. The Giants would finish 11th with eleven wins.

In the 2016 AFL Season, The Giants would get their second win over the Bulldogs in Round 9, 98–73 at Spotless Stadium At the conclusion of the 2016 AFL season, Greater Western Sydney finished fourth on the ladder with 16 wins and 6 losses, meaning it would face minor premiers and cross-town rivals Sydney in a Qualifying final. The Giants won by 36 points in an upset at Stadium Australia, advancing directly to the preliminary final.

Meanwhile, the Western Bulldogs had finished seventh with 15 wins and 7 losses following a season in which several key players suffered serious injuries, among them captain Robert Murphy, midfielder Mitch Wallis and forward Jack Redpath, while they were also without forward Stewart Crameri who was serving a season-long suspension for his role in his former club Essendon's controversial sports supplements program during the 2012 AFL season. In 2016, the AFL had introduced a bye week before the finals series in an attempt to stop clubs resting players ahead of the finals. The move was met with mixed reactions across the clubs, but for the Bulldogs, it allowed the club's medical staff to work on helping Jack Macrae, Easton Wood and Tom Liberatore recover from various injuries. All three would play critical roles in the Bulldogs' finals campaign.

The two teams would meet in the 2016 AFL First Preliminary Final at Spotless Stadium, in which the Bulldogs were attempting to make their first AFL grand final appearance in 55 years while the Giants were attempting to reach the grand final for the first time in their fifth season in the AFL. 

Going into this match, the Western Bulldogs had won four of the six matches played between the pair dating back to their first meeting in round five, 2012. The two teams met only once during the regular season, in round nine, with Greater Western Sydney winning by 25 points.

Despite this only being their fifth season in the AFL, and missing 2007 Norm Smith Medallist Steve Johnson through suspension, Greater Western Sydney was the favourite to win the preliminary final and progress to the Grand Final. The Bulldogs, on the other hand, had lost nine of their previous ten preliminary finals, the most recent in 2010.

After over five minutes of play, Greater Western Sydney registered the first score of the match, a behind to Dylan Shiel, before Clay Smith (Western Bulldogs) kicked the first goal of the match less than a minute later. Two goals to each side saw the Bulldogs lead by two points at the quarter-time break. The Bulldogs then kicked four goals to three in the second quarter, during which two players suffered game-ending injuries: Bulldogs ruckman Jordan Roughead, who had a ball kicked in his face, and Giants co-captain Callan Ward, who was accidentally kneed in the head by Zaine Cordy. 

At half-time, the Bulldogs led by nine points. Three minutes into the third quarter, Rory Lobb kicked a goal for the Giants to bring the margin back to one point, before a rushed behind brought the scores level at 41. However, Tory Dickson would kick a goal shortly after to give his side back the lead; another goal to Lobb and one to Jonathan Patton would see the Giants open up an eleven-point lead, before late goals to Marcus Bontempelli and Caleb Daniel saw the Giants' lead reduced to one point at three-quarter-time. Two goals to the Giants to start the final quarter saw them take a 14-point lead, the biggest by any side during the match, before goals to Dickson, Bontempelli and Cordy saw the Bulldogs reclaim the lead. Shortly after, Patton would kick a goal for the Giants and, with less than five minutes remaining, scores would be tied at 82 points apiece. Jack Macrae, who to that point of the season had only kicked one goal, was then paid a mark inside the Bulldogs' forward 50 despite a late spoil from Nick Haynes; he then kicked the match's final goal and despite some desperation from the Giants, the Bulldogs would ultimately hang on to win by six points.

By winning, the Western Bulldogs progressed to the 2016 AFL Grand Final the following week against the Sydney Swans. It was to be just their third appearance in a Grand Final, but first since 1961. 

The Bulldogs ultimately went on to win their second flag, defeating the Swans by 22 points with Jason Johannisen winning the Norm Smith Medal as the best player on ground. They thus became the first team since Adelaide in 1997 to win four consecutive finals, as well as the first ever team to win the premiership after finishing seventh at the conclusion of the home-and-away season.

2017–2019: Greene, Bontempelli and Second Finals Meeting 
In the 2017 AFL Season, the Giants and Bulldogs played twice, the Giants would win both games, 75–73 at Manuka Oval in Round 6 and 105–57 at Etihad Stadium in Round 21.

The rivalry was further exacerbated by an incident in Round 21, 2017, in which Giants small forward Toby Greene collected Bulldog Luke Dahlhaus in the face with his foot while flying for a mark. Greene avoided suspension for the incident. Giants won by 48 points, 105–57 at Eithad Stadium. 

Greene copped a two-match suspension for punching Caleb Daniel’s head in 2017. 

The Giants would finish the 2017 season 4th with fourteen wins and reach the preliminarily final defeating Adelaide in the qualifying final, West Coast in the semi final and losing to eventual premiers, Richmond in front of a crowd of 94,000, the biggest crowd the club has played in front of. The Bulldogs would finish 10th with eleven wins becoming the first team since Hawthorn in 2009 to miss the finals the year after winning the premiership.

In the 2018 AFL Season, the Giants beat the Bulldogs by 82 in the opening round at Manuka Oval, 133–51. The Giants would finish the 2018 season 7th with thirteen wins and reach the semi finals defeating rivals Sydney in the qualifying final and losing to Collingwood in the semi final. Ryan Griffen announced his retirement from AFL football following the loss, Griffen played 257 games with the Bulldogs and Giants across 14 AFL seasons. The Bulldogs would finish 13th with eight wins.

In the 2019 AFL Season, the Bulldogs beat the Giants by 61 points in Round 22, in what was their first match at the Sydney Showground Stadium since the 2016 preliminary final. 

On 16 May 2019, having not played at the top level since round 18 in 2018 amid battles with injury and mental health, Tom Boyd announced his immediate retirement from the AFL.  

The Giants would finish the 2019 season 6th with thirteen wins and the Bulldogs would finish 7th with twelve wins. Three weeks after the Round 22 clash, the Giants would get their revenge, defeating the Bulldogs in a fierce and at times violent contest by 58 points in the second elimination final to progress to a semi-final against the Brisbane Lions at the Gabba and end the Bulldogs' season

Three weeks later, in week one of the 2019 AFL finals series, the two faced off in the Second Elimination Final, where the Giants would thump the Bulldogs in a 58-point win and get their finals revenge in a fierce and at times violent contest to progress to a semi-final against the Brisbane Lions at the Gabba and end the Bulldogs' season. In that game, the Giants and Bulldogs would engage in on-field fights, with GWS attacking Western Bulldogs superstar Marcus Bontempelli. Bontempelli escaped with a $7500 fine and was charged with serious misconduct for injuring Nick Haynes. Bontempelli was left with bruises around his right eye, and the Bulldogs players were privately fuming. Western Bulldogs players “wished they knew” that Greater Western Sydney antagonist Toby Greene targeted Marcus Bontempelli’s face during an ugly scuffle which typified this year’s heated elimination final. A host of Bulldogs, including Patrick Lipinski and teenagers Rhylee West and Bailey Smith, were in the vicinity when Greene grabbed at Bontempelli’s face and then pulled his hair while at the bottom of a pack.

The Giants would go on to defeat the Brisbane Lions by three points in the semi-final at the Gabba before holding on to defeat Collingwood by four points in the preliminary final. In doing so, the Giants became only the second team since the introduction of the AFL final eight system in 2000 to reach the grand final without earning a spot in the top four, after the Bulldogs qualified for the 2016 decider from seventh position (and would eventually win that year's premiership). They met 2017 premiers Richmond in the 2019 AFL Grand Final on 28 September in their first-ever grand final. The Giants were defeated by the Tigers, who won their second flag in three years by a margin of 89 points—one of the heaviest defeats ever suffered in a VFL/AFL Grand Final.

2020–present 
A similar event would occur in Round 3 of the 2020 AFL Season where The Giants turned sent Nick Haynes out for the coin toss instead of captain Stephen Coniglio to meet with Bulldogs skipper Marcus Bontempelli, who fractured Haynes’ larynx the previous year. The two teams engaged in constant melees throughout a match leaving 15 players cited by the AFL Match Review Panel with fines totalling $7750. The Bulldogs would go on to win by 24 points 57-33 at Marvel Stadium. 

The Bulldogs would finish the 2020 season 7th with ten wins, reachingan elimination final and losing to St Kilda; the Giants, meanwhile, would finish 10th with eight wins, missing the finals for the first time since 2015. They became the third team in four years to miss the finals after playing in the previous year's decider (after 2016 premiers, Western Bulldogs, and 2017 runners-up, Adelaide).

In the 2021 AFL Season, the Bulldogs defeated the Giants 116–65 in Round 6 at Manuka Oval. The Giants would finish 7th with eleven wins and reach the semi-finals, losing to Geelong. The Bulldogs would finish the 2021 season 5th with 15 wins and secure a second Grand Final appearance in six years with wins over Essendon in an elimination final, Brisbane in the semi-final, and Port Adelaide in their first preliminary final since 2016. The Bulldogs would lose to Melbourne in the 2021 Grand Final.

In the 2022 AFL Season, the Bulldogs defeated the Giants 125–105 in Round 14 at Sydney Showground Stadium. They would meet a second time in Round 22; the Bulldogs defeated the Giants 62–57 at Marvel Stadium

Head-to-head

Common individuals

Players 
The following players have played for both the Giants and the Bulldogs in their careers:

 Callan Ward – Bulldogs (2008-2011), Giants (2012–present)
 Sam Reid – Bulldogs (2008-2011), Giants (2012–13) (2016–2021)
 Dylan Addison – Bulldogs (2006-2011), Giants (2013–2015)
 Ryan Griffen – Bulldogs (2005-2014), Giants (2015–2018)
 Tom Boyd – Giants (2014), Bulldogs (2015–2019)
Adam Treloar – Giants (2012-2015), Bulldogs (2021–present)
Josh Bruce – Giants (2012-2013), Bulldogs (2020–present)

Others 

 Leon Cameron – Bulldogs (1990–1999 player), Giants (2014–2022 senior coach)
 Jason McCartney – Bulldogs (2011–2017 manager), Giants (2017–present list manager)

See also 

 Rivalries in the Australian Football League
 Western Bulldogs
 Greater Western Sydney Giants

References 

Sports rivalries in Australia